Vindeln Municipality is a municipality in Västerbotten County in northern Sweden. Its seat is located in Vindeln.

History
In 1971 a local government reform was implemented in Sweden. This municipality was, however, not amalgamated with any other. But in preparation for the reform the name was changed in 1969 from Degerfors Municipality to Vindeln Municipality. The reason was that there is another Degerfors Municipality (in Örebro County), and every municipality in Sweden should have a unique name.

Geography
The Vindel River, which is the main tributary of the Ume River, runs through the municipality and has given it its name. The municipality's coat of arms depicts a salmon, of which there are plenty in the river.

Localities

There are five localities (or urban areas) in Vindeln Municipality:

The municipal seat in bold

References

External links

 Vindeln Municipality - Official site

Municipalities of Västerbotten County